Robert Ritchie was a Hong Kong racecar driver who won the Macau Grand Prix in 1955. At the time of his win, he was a sergeant in the Royal Air Force.

References

Hong Kong racing drivers
Possibly living people
Year of birth missing